Tyrone ("Ty") Noonan is an Australian musician, best known for his vocals, guitars, keyboards and songwriting in the Brisbane band George.

He has also worked as a composer for Australian theatre companies La Boite and Queensland Theatre Company. In 2005 following George's disbanding, Noonan began pursuing a solo career. In 2006, Noonan released his debut EP Heavy Soul Part I.

Discography

Studio albums

Extended plays

Awards

Queensland Music Awards
The Queensland Music Awards (previously known as Q Song Awards) are annual awards celebrating Queensland, Australia's brightest emerging artists and established legends. They commenced in 2006.

 (wins only)
|-
| 2008
|  "The Family Song"
| Gospel / Spiritual Song of the Year 
| 
|-

References

External links 
 

Living people
Australian musicians
Year of birth missing (living people)